Kanyarathna is a 1963 Indian Kannada language film directed by J. D. Thotan in his directorial debut. It stars Dr. Rajkumar and Leelavathi. The supporting cast features Rajashankar, Balakrishna, Dikki Madhava Rao, Rathnakar and Sowcar Janaki.

Cast
 Rajkumar as Raju
 Leelavathi
 Raja Shankar as Shivaprakash
 Balakrishna
 Dikki Madhava Rao
 Rathnakar
 Sowcar Janaki
 Ramadevi
 Papamma
 B. Jaya
 Sharadadevi
 Ashwath Narayana

Soundtrack

G. K. Venkatesh composed the music for the soundtracks and the lyrics were penned by K. R. Seetharama Shastry, K. Prabhakar Shastry, Chi. Sadashivaiah and Vijaya Narasimha. The soundtrack album consists of seven tracks.

References

External links

1963 films
1960s Kannada-language films
Films scored by G. K. Venkatesh